Feteer meshaltet (literally "cushioned pies" or "cushion-like pies"), often simply referred to as feteer, is a flaky Egyptian layered pastry. It consists of many thin layers of dough and ghee and an optional filling. The fillings can be both sweet or savory. Sweet fillings may include cheese, coconut, mehalabiya, malban, nutella or chocolate, while savory fillings can be anything from ground beef to sausage or cheese. Plain feteer is usually soaked in honey and spread with jam or cheese or served with olives. Because of its versatility, feteer is often referred to as an Egyptian pizza.

Feteer meshaltet has become an important symbol of hospitality in Egypt. As such, it was served to American president Barack Obama during his visit to Egypt in June 2009. Egyptian families traditionally give it as gifts to visitors and friends. It is also commonly prepared for holidays, weddings, and other celebrations.

History
Feteer meshaltet dates back to ancient Egypt, where it was known as "feteer maltoot". It was left at temples as an offering to the gods.

See also
Manakish

References

External links

Feteer meshaltet recipe – Amira's Pantry
Feteer meshaltet recipe from Cairo Kitchen by Suzanne Zeidy

Egyptian cuisine
Arab desserts
Arab pastries